Denis Čery (born 1 August 1994) is a Slovak football midfielder who currently plays for FC Petržalka .

FC Nitra
He made his debut for Nitra against Ružomberok on 21 July 2012.

References

External links
FC Nitra profile

1994 births
Living people
Slovak footballers
Association football midfielders
FC Nitra players
PFK Piešťany players
MŠK Rimavská Sobota players
MFK Lokomotíva Zvolen players
Slovak Super Liga players
2. Liga (Slovakia) players